Union Valley is an unincorporated community located within Monroe Township in Middlesex County, New Jersey, United States. Two large age-restricted communities lie within the settlement today, Clearbrook Park and Concordia. Other than those two communities, the only other buildings in the area are medical offices and facilities and some single-family homes along Union Valley Road (part of County Route 615 west of the area).

References

Monroe Township, Middlesex County, New Jersey
Unincorporated communities in Middlesex County, New Jersey
Unincorporated communities in New Jersey